Raymond Frederick Jacobs (born January 2, 1902 in Salt Lake City, Utah - April 5, 1952 in Los Angeles, California), was an American infielder in Major League Baseball who made two pinch-hit appearances for the Chicago Cubs in its 1928 season.

External links
 
 

1902 births
1952 deaths
Major League Baseball infielders
Chicago Cubs players
Spokane Indians managers
Twin Falls Cowboys players
Baseball players from Salt Lake City
Los Angeles Angels (minor league) players
Minneapolis Millers (baseball) players
Toledo Mud Hens players
Galveston Buccaneers players
Hollywood Stars players
Portland Beavers players
San Diego Padres (minor league) players
Yakima Pippins players
Spokane Indians players